Slapton Castle is an Iron Age hill fort situated close to Slapton in Devon, England.

References

External links
 

Hill forts in Devon
Stokenham